Eigenji Dam is a gravity concrete & fill dam (compound) dam located in Shiga prefecture in Japan. The dam is used for irrigation and power production. The catchment area of the dam is 131.5 km2. The dam impounds about 98  ha of land when full and can store 22741 thousand cubic meters of water. The construction of the dam was started on 1952 and completed in 1972.

References

Dams in Shiga Prefecture
1972 establishments in Japan